"Why" is a song by British music producer and remixer D Mob featuring singer-songwriter Cathy Dennis. It was released as the fourth single from Dennis's second album, Into the Skyline (1992), a full year after her previous single from the album. In the UK, it reached number 23 on the UK Singles Chart, number seven on the UK Dance Singles Chart and number one on the UK Club Chart, making it the most successful single from the album. "Why" was dedicated in memory of Philip Hall, who died in December 1993.

Critical reception
Andy Beevers from Music Week gave the song five out of five, writing, "Danny D is rejoined by his protege Cathy Dennis for this resurrection of his D Mob project. "Why?" is a catchy song delivered in a variety of strong club mixes, ranging from swing to house." Sam Wood from Philadelphia Inquirer felt that "Why" "do recall the bouncy ebullience" of "Just Another Dream", which was Dennis' breakthrough hit. Tim Jeffery from the RM Dance Update complimented it as a "bright, chirpy pop garage number that chugs along nicely." He concluded that Dennis' voice "is so distinctive that everyone will think this is her own single." Another editor, James Hamilton, called it a "plaintively insistent lurching jiggly ditty".

Track listing
 UK CD single
 "Why" (Radio Edit)
 "Why" (Tee's Radio Edit)
 "Why" (R&B Edit)
 "Why" (Monster Club Mix)
 "Why" (Tee's Club Mix)
 "Why" (Dean Street mix)

Charts

References

1993 songs
1994 singles
Cathy Dennis songs
FFRR Records singles
Songs written by Cathy Dennis
Songs written by D Mob